Gurd may refer to:

 Gurd, Iran, a village in Gilan Province, Iran
 Gyrd and Gnupa, Danish kings
 Gurd, a member of the Ginyu Force in the manga Dragon Ball and its anime adaptation Dragon Ball Z

See also
 Gerd (disambiguation)
 Gird (disambiguation)